Jinx Money is a 1948 film starring the comedy team of The Bowery Boys.  It is the tenth film in the series and the first one to include Bennie Bartlett as part of the team.

Plot
Pollack, an underworld gambler, is murdered, but before he dies he hides $50,000 that he just won gambling in a newspaper and kicks it under a car.  The next day Sach and Slip are walking in the street and find the paper and the cash.  Gabe, who is a reporter, runs a story on them finding the money and the gangsters that Pollack won the money from come looking for them. One by one they take the money from the boys and are immediately killed by the mysterious "umbrella".  Eventually the boys get tired of having the money taken from them and people dying around them so they hand the money over to the police.  The "umbrella", not knowing that they boys no longer have the money, comes to collect it from them and is captured by the police who were staking the boys hideout waiting for the killer.

After a short period of time the police return the money to the boys since no one has claimed it.  They immediately hand over $38,000 to various charities that they promised the money to.  Just as they were celebrating an IRS officer arrives and collects the remaining $12,000 for taxes and they are left broke and still owing Louie $5.00.  As they leave the Sweet Shop they see a $5.00 bill on the street and scramble for it, with Slip finally getting it.  But his possession of it does not last long as Louie steps in and takes it to settle their tab with him.

Cast

The Bowery Boys
 Leo Gorcey as Terrance Aloysius 'Slip' Mahoney
 Huntz Hall as Horace Debussy 'Sach' Jones
 William Benedict as Whitey
 David Gorcey as Chuck
 Bennie Bartlett as Butch

Remaining cast
 Gabriel Dell as Gabe
 Bernard Gorcey as Louie Dumbrowski
 Sheldon Leonard as Lippy Harris
 Donald MacBride as Lt. Broderick
 Betty Caldwell as Candy

Home media
Warner Archives released the film on made-to-order DVD in the United States as part of "The Bowery Boys, Volume Three" on October 1, 2013.

References

External links 
 
 
 
 

1948 films
Bowery Boys films
1940s English-language films
Monogram Pictures films
Films directed by William Beaudine
American black-and-white films